Diego de Covarrubias y Leyva or Covarruvias (July 25, 1512 – September 27, 1577) was a Spanish jurist and Roman Catholic prelate who served as Archbishop (Personal Title) of Cuenca (1577-1577), Archbishop (Personal Title) of Segovia (1564-1577), Archbishop (Personal Title) of Ciudad Rodrigo (1560-1564), and Archbishop of Santo Domingo (1556-1560).

Life

Early years

Covarruvias was born in Toledo, Spain, on 25 July 1512. His father was Alonso de Covarrubias (1488-1570), an architect who designed the New Kings chapel of the Cathedral of Toledo. Diego's younger brother, Antonio de Covarrubias (1514/24-1602), would be a professor of law at the University of Salamanca and served as consejero of Castile.

Diego de Covarrubias was educated at the University of Salamanca, where he studied canon law under Martín de Azpilcueta and theology under Francisco de Vitoria and Domingo de Soto. At the age of twenty-one, Covarruvias was appointed professor of canon law in the University of Salamanca. Later on he was entrusted with the work of reforming that institution, already venerable for its age, and the legislation which he drew up looking to this end remained in effect long after his time.

Such was the recognized eminence of his legal science that he was styled the Bartolus of Spain. His vast legal learning was always set forth with a peculiar beauty of diction and lucidity of style. His genius was universal, and embraced all the sciences subsidiary to, and illustrative of, the science of law. If report be true, the large library of Oviedo, where at the age of twenty-six he became professor, did not contain a single volume which he had not annotated.

Episcopate
On April 24, 1556, Covarruvias was designated by Charles V for the archiepiscopal see of San Domingo in the New World, whither, however, he never went. On January 26, 1560, he was appointed Bishop of Ciudad Rodrigo in Spain. On April 28, 1560, he was consecrated bishop by Fernando de Valdés y Salas, Archbishop of Sevilla with Martín Pérez de Ayala, Bishop of Guadix, and Diego de los Cobos Molina, Bishop of Ávila, as co-consecrators. In this capacity he attended the Council of Trent, where, according to the statement of his nephew, conjointly with Cardinal Ugo Buoncompagni (afterwards Gregory XIII), he was authorized to formulate the reform-decrees (De Reformatione) of the council. Pressure of other duties having prevented Buoncompagni from doing his part of the work, so the task devolved upon Covarruvias alone. The text of these decrees, therefore, formally approved by the council, we apparently owe to him.

Having returned to Spain, Covarruvias was in 1565 transferred to the See of Segovia. Up to this time his extraordinary talents had been discovered in matters more or less scholastic only; they were hereafter to reveal themselves also in practical affairs of state. Appointed in 1572 a member of the Council of Castile, he was two years later raised to the presidency of the Council of State. In the discharge of this office he was eminently successful. While president of the Council of State he was nominated by Philip II for the Bishopric of Cuenca, but death prevented him from assuming his duties. Covarruvias died in Madrid, on 27 September 1577. While Bishop, he was the principal co-consecrator of Pedro de la Peña, Bishop of Quito.

He was buried in a marble sarcophagus in Segovia Cathedral, near the old entrance to the cathedral built by the Catholic Monarchs, which today leads to the cloister.

Works

The principal work of Covarruvias is his Variarum resolutionum ex jure pontificio regio et cæsareo libri IV. He wrote also on testaments, betrothal and marriage, oaths, excommunication, prescription, restitution, etc. Quite distinct in character from his other productions is his numismatic treatise, Veterum numismatum collatio cum his quæ modo expenduntur, etc. (1594). His complete works have been several times edited, the Antwerp edition (5 vols., 1762) being the best. Among his manuscripts have been found notes on the Council of Trent, a treatise on punishments (De poenis) and an historical tract, "Catalogo de los reyes de España y de otras cosas", etc.

References

External links and additional sources
 (for Chronology of Bishops) 
 (for Chronology of Bishops) 
 (for Chronology of Bishops) 
 (for Chronology of Bishops) 
 (for Chronology of Bishops) 
 (for Chronology of Bishops) 
 

16th-century Spanish jurists
1512 births
1577 deaths
University of Salamanca alumni
Academic staff of the University of Salamanca
16th-century Roman Catholic bishops in Spain
Participants in the Council of Trent
People from Toledo, Spain
Roman Catholic archbishops of Santo Domingo
School of Salamanca
16th-century Roman Catholic archbishops in the Dominican Republic